Moon Young is a 2015 South Korean drama film written and directed by Kim So-yeon and starring Kim Tae-ri.

Cast
 Kim Tae-ri as Moon-young 
 Jung Hyun as Hee-soo 
 Park Wan-gyu as Father
 Park Jung-sik as Kwon Hyuk-chul 
 Jang Hyang-sook as Middle-Aged Woman 1  
 Heo Won-jeong as Middle-Aged Woman 2 
 Nam Bo-ra as Yeong-eun
 Lee Jin-kyeong as Teacher

Release
Filmed in February 2013, Moon Young debuted as a short film at the Seoul Independent Film Festival in 2015, approximately 43 minutes in length.

An expanded version of the film, with a runtime of 64 minutes, was theatrically released on January 12, 2017.

References

External links

Moon Young at Naver Movies 

2015 short films
South Korean drama films
South Korean short films
Korean Sign Language films
2015 films
2015 drama films
2010s South Korean films